The Assembly of Alsace is the deliberative assembly which administers the European Collectivity of Alsace (CEA) since January 1, 2021.

The law of August 2, 2019 relating to the competences of the CEA specifies that until the next renewal of the departmental councils, the assembly of Alsace would be composed of all the departmental councilors of Bas-Rhin and Haut-Rhin.

Ordinance No. 2020-1304 indicates that the address of the community is located temporarily on Place du Quartier Blanc in Strasbourg. Its first plenary session was held on January 2, 2021 in Colmar, where the 80 elected officials sat until the departmental elections of June 2021.

The plenary session of September 27, 2021 confirmed Strasbourg as the seat of the community and Colmar for the holding of the assemblies (with the exception of the vote on the budget).

Executive

President 
Frédéric Bierry (LR) is the president of the assembly since January 2021.

Vice-Presidents

Composition

References 

Departmental councils (France)
Politics of Alsace